Cuba is a 1979 American adventure thriller film directed by Richard Lester and starring Sean Connery, portraying the build-up to the 1958 Cuban Revolution, filmed in Panavision. Neil Sinyard in his The Films of Richard Lester wrote that the film, "developed originally out of an idea of Lester's own, inspired by a conversation with a friend about great modern leaders. From there, Lester's thoughts began to formulate in complex ways around Castro and Casablanca (1942) and out of that audaciously bizarre combination comes Cuba.

Plot
Former British Major and mercenary Robert Dapes (Sean Connery) arrives in Cuba under General Bello's (Martin Balsam) orders as part of the dictator Fulgencio Batista's forces. He is to train the Cuban army to resist Fidel Castro's revolt. Before he even begins his task, he encounters an old flame, Alexandra Lopez de Pulido (Brooke Adams), whom he repeatedly pursues. The plot winds around the tremendous wealth of the Cuban leaders, the mainly American tourists with their seemingly endless money, the poverty-stricken and ex-urban slums where many Cubans live, and the rum and cigar factory owned by Alexandra's selfish husband Juan Pulido (Chris Sarandon) and managed by Alexandra.

When Alexandra's husband takes her out and expects her to drink with a potential (factory) investor and his prostitute, she leaves the restaurant and meets Robert.  Furious with her husband, she spends time with Robert, reminiscing about their affair in North Africa (when she was 15 and he was 30).  They go to a motel and make love.  They care for one another, but Robert will not stay in Cuba.

The following day, the Cuban workers strike, including those in Alexandra's factory. Robert is taken captive by several Cuban rebels which lead an attack against a military facility. Robert escapes, and alienated with the corrupt Cuban government that he has come to loathe, aids the rebels in defeating the government troops.

Alexandra watches events pass by, believing life will soon return to normal. Robert begs her to leave, either to be with him or simply to escape Cuba. She refuses. Alex's husband is killed by the same Cuban rebel who stalked Robert throughout the film.

Ultimately, Robert, not seeing Alexandra at the airport, boards the aircraft to escape with other foreigners. Meanwhile, Alexandra is present, outside the fence, weeping as she watches Robert board the aircraft.

Robert and most of the other American, British, and wealthy Cubans flee from Cuba as Fidel comes to power while Alexandra remains behind, alone, to face an unknown future under the new communist government.

Cast

 Sean Connery as Major Robert Dapes
 Brooke Adams as Alexandra Lopez de Pulido
 Jack Weston as Larry Gutman
 Hector Elizondo as Captain Raphael Ramirez
 Denholm Elliott as Donald Skinner
 Martin Balsam as Gen. Bello
 Chris Sarandon as Juan Pulido
 Danny De La Paz as Julio Mederos
 Lonette McKee as Therese Mederos
 Alejandro Rey as Faustino
 Louisa Moritz as Miss Wonderly
 Dave King as Miss Wonderly's Press Agent
 Walter Gotell as Don Jose Pulido
 David Rappaport as Jesus
 Wolfe Morris as General Fulgencio Batista
 Michael Lees as Roger Maxwell-Lafroy
 Tony Mathews as Carrillo
 Roger Lloyd-Pack as Nunez
 Leticia Garrido as Celia
 Maria Charles as Senora Pulido
 Pauline Peart as Dolores
 Anna Nicholas as Maria
 Earl Cameron as Colonel Leyva
 John Morton as Gary
 Anthony Pullen Shaw as Spencer
 Stefan Kalipha as Ramon, Cigar Factory Foreman
 Raul Newney as Painter
 Ram John Holder as Fat Sergeant
 James Turner as Pulido's Chauffeur
 Willis Bouchey as Cavalry Officer on TV (archive footage) (uncredited)
 Ana Obregón as Woman (uncredited)

Production
Cuba was shot in Spain in December 1978. The same historical events were featured five years earlier in Francis Ford Coppola's The Godfather Part II and would be covered again by Sydney Pollack in his 1990 film Havana, starring Robert Redford. Lester's film was perhaps the most stylish of the three, aided by its stirring Spanish locations, "with a marvelous sense of atmosphere".

Diana Ross was offered the female lead but turned it down. Brooke Adams, who had just received acclaim for Days of Heaven, was cast instead.

The aircraft in Cuba are:
 Douglas DC-6B c/n 45077/728, EC-DCK
 Dornier Do 27 c/n 2094, EC-BSX
 North American TB-25N Mitchell s/n 44-29121, N86427
 Douglas C-54A Skymaster c/n 10408, s/n 42-72303, G-APID
 Lockheed C-130H Hercules

Reception
Cuba received mostly negative reviews from major critics, with the exception of the December 18, 1979 review in The Hollywood Reporter that praised the film’s “sense of authenticity of place” and its skillful inter-cutting of newsreel footage. While some critics mentioned the film’s pro-Castro stance, the reviewer explained that “the picture, while taking no position on Cuba today, makes appallingly clear the conditions that made Castro’s revolution inevitable.” Another positive review came from film historian, Leonard Maltin who noted: "Director Lester is in pretty good form with most scenes punctuated by throwaway bits."

The review of Cuba by Vincent Canby in The New York Times was more typical of the critical responses. He wrote "Richard Lester's 'Cuba', which is set in Cuba late in 1958, in the weeks immediately preceding the triumph of Fidel Castro's revolution, is a straight-faced romantic melodrama that's almost as lunatic as Mr. Lester's 'Help!' and 'How I Won the War', both written by Charles Wood, who also wrote the screenplay for the new film. I can't help but suspect that at some point during the production, which was shot in Spain, Mr. Lester and his associates decided that there was absolutely no way to realize the Harold Robbins-like potential of the story and chose, instead, to make a film that is a crazy fantasy about old-time Hollywood melodramas.

Film critic Leslie Halliwell in Leslie Halliwell's Film Guide (1989) similarly reviewed Cuba, declaring " (an) aimless romantic melodrama which gets absolutely nowhere and might have been better played in the Casablanca-vein.

References

Notes

Citations

Bibliography

 Ferguson, Fiona. "Review: 'Cuba'. in Pym, John, ed. Time Out Film Guide. London: Time Out Guides Limited, 2004. .
 Halliwell, Leslie. Leslie Halliwell's Film Guide. New York: Harper & Roe, 1989. .
 Maltin, Leonard. Leonard Maltin's Movie Guide 2013. New York: New American Library, 2012 (originally published as TV Movies, then Leonard Maltin’s Movie & Video Guide), First edition 1969, published annually since 1988. .
 Pfeiffer, Lee and Phillip Lisa. The Films of Sean Connery. New York: Kensington Publishing Co., 2001.  .

External links
 
 
 
 
 
 

1979 films
Films directed by Richard Lester
1970s action adventure films
Films scored by Patrick Williams
Films about the Cuban Revolution
Films set in Havana
Cuban Revolution in fiction
American aviation films
United Artists films
American action adventure films
Films about mercenaries
1970s English-language films
1970s American films